Lookout Mountain is a mountain in Sussex County, New Jersey. It is part of the New York–New Jersey Highlands of the Appalachian Mountains.

References 

Mountains of Sussex County, New Jersey
Mountains of New Jersey